The Automotive Video Association, more commonly referred to as the AVA, is a partnership of prominent YouTube video journalists who cover the automotive industry. Founded in 2017, they reach more than 500 million viewers per year.

The organization hosts an annual automotive awards event where jurors choose the performance SUV and car of the year.

Member channels 
The following are the current member channels of the AVA:

Our Auto Expert 
Founded by broadcaster Nik Miles, Our Auto Expert is an automotive video review site. It features videos created for local network stations.

The Fast Lane Car 
Founded by automotive journalist Roman Mica, TFLCar is a multi-channel automotive video organization with its parent channel having over 898,000 subscribers as of April 2020. The channel is based out of Colorado.

Alex on Autos 
Founded by automotive journalist Alex Dykes, Alex on Autos is an automotive video review channel with over 340,000 subscribers as of April 2020. The channel is based out of California.

Redline Reviews 
Founded by automotive journalist Sofyan Bey, Redline Reviews is an automotive video review channel with over 739,000 subscribers as of April 2020. The channel is based out of Pennsylvania.

Engineering Explained 
Founded by mechanical engineer Jason Fenske, Engineering Explained is an educational automotive channel with over 2.61 million subscribers as of April 2020. The channel is based out of Oregon.

Matt Maran Motoring 
Founded by automotive journalist Matt Maranowski, Matt Maran Motoring is an automotive video review channel with over 408,000 subscribers as of April 2020. The channel is based out of Pennsylvania.

References

Automotive industry
Journalism organizations